The 2007 AFF U-17 Youth Championship was played for the third time in 2007.  It was held in Phnom Penh, Cambodia from 19 August to 2 September 2007.  Nine nations took part, all from the ASEAN region. No guest nations were invited.  The nine teams were drawn into 2 groups. One group of 5 nations and the second group of 4 nations. The winners and runners up would progress to the semi-final stage.

Squads 
Indonesia
Malaysia
Singapore

Group stage 
All times are Indochina Time (ICT) – UTC+7

Group A

Group B

Knockout stage

Bracket

Semi-finals

Third place play-off

Final

Statistics

Goalscorers

References 
"ASEAN Under 17 - 2007". at AseanFootball.org

U16
2007
International association football competitions hosted by Cambodia
2007 in youth association football